The 1896–97 French Rugby Union Championship was won by Stade Français.

The title was assigned after a round-robin tournament played by six clubs (all from Paris) : le Stade Français, l'Union Athlétique du Premier, le Racing club de France, le Cosmopolitan Club, l'Union Sportive de l'Est et l'Olympique.

Classement final 
 Stade Français: 10 points
 Olympique : 8 points
 Racing Club de France : 6 points
 Cosmopolitan Club, Union Sportive de l'Est, Union Athlétique du Premier : 2 points

Cosmopolitan declared forfeit for the matches against Stade Français et le Racing.

External links
 Compte rendu du championnat 1897, sur lnr.fr

1897
France
Championship